Medfield Meadow Lots are a group of wetland meadows—Pratt Meadow, Perry Meadow, and Hinsdale Meadow—located in the Charles River floodplain within Medfield, Massachusetts, United States. The lots, totaling , are accessible by canoe or kayak only. They were acquired as an open space reserve via land donation by Henry Lee Shattuck in 1968.

The Medfield Meadow Lots are part of a cooperative effort of non-profit organizations and public agencies to protect the natural and ecological character of the Charles River.

See also
Charles River

References

External links
Medfield Meadow Lots The Trustees of Reservations
Charles River Watershed Association
Charles River Conservancy

The Trustees of Reservations
Open space reserves of Massachusetts
Protected areas of Norfolk County, Massachusetts
Landforms of Norfolk County, Massachusetts
Meadows in the United States
Protected areas established in 1968
1968 establishments in Massachusetts